Cottonmouth (Cornell Stokes) is a supervillain appearing in American comic books published by Marvel Comics.

The character was portrayed by Mahershala Ali in the first season of the Marvel Cinematic Universe television series Luke Cage.

Publication history
The character first appeared in Luke Cage, Power Man #18 (June 1974) in a story written by Len Wein and drawn by George Tuska. Cornell Cottonmouth, or just Cottonmouth, started out as a drug kingpin in New York City. He was involved in the events that led to Luke Cage gaining super powers and becoming "Power Man". Cottonmouth tried to recruit Cage to his organization, but was ultimately knocked out and turned over to police by Cage. During the "Shadowland" storyline, Cottonmouth returned as part of Nightshade's gang, Flashmob where they come into conflict with Daredevil as well as a new Power Man, who, like his predecessor, knocked Cottonmouth out and turned him over to police.

Fictional character biography
Not much is known about Cornell Cottonmouth's history except that he has established himself as a drug lord in New York. When Willis Stryker wanted to frame Carl Lucas, he stole a shipment of heroin from Cottonmouth's organization.

Upon changing his name to Luke Cage, Carl decided to track down the drugs that were used to frame him. Cage used a number of informants in his search. The informant Flea was successful in his search yet his investigations were discovered. Before dying from the poisons inflicted on him by Cottonmouth's men, Flea managed to inform Cage of his discovery. Upon learning who sent Flea to infiltrate his organization, Cottonmouth got the idea of recruiting Cage to his organization. He sent his trademark snakes to Luke's office "to show him that he means business." Cottonmouth then sent his henchmen Mike and Ike to make an offer to Luke. Luke managed to take out the snakes and defeat Mike and Ike. Mike ended up snitching to Luke where Cottonmouth was located. Luke agreed to join Cottonmouth's organization (to learn where his records were kept). Cottonmouth then began to test Cage's loyalty by sending him to steal a shipment of heroin from the rival crimeboss, Morgan. After Cage's success, he earned Cottonmouth's trust and began working for him until Cottonmouth caught Cage attempting to steal his records. Cottonmouth attacked Luke and was assisted by his henchman Slick. Cage then knocked Cottonmouth into Slick who fell out a window to his death. When Cottonmouth stated that the supposed records were in Slick's mind, Luke slammed Cottonmouth into an oak desk where Cottonmouth fell unconscious. Cage then called the police to come pick up Cottonmouth.

During the 2010 "Shadowland" storyline, Cottonmouth appeared as a member of Nightshade's gang called the Rivals. Cottonmouth established a section of turf where he sold drugs and hired out prostitutes only for him to be attacked by Hand ninjas that were sent by Daredevil. However, Power Man arrived dispersing the Hand ninjas and then Power Man broke Cottonmouth's teeth. Cottonmouth later had his broken teeth replaced by gold-capped sharp teeth. When Power Man was apparently beaten and defeated by five corrupt police officers, Cottonmouth prepared to bite off a part of Power Man's face only to be leashed by Nightshade. At first, Cottonmouth was surprised when Nightshade offered Power Man to become her enforcer. Cottonmouth then became pleased when Nightshade had set up Power Man to fight Iron Fist. To Nightshade's surprise, Power Man managed to side with Iron Fist and knocked out Cottonmouth while Nightshade escaped.

During the 2011 "Spider-Island" storyline, Cottonmouth alongside Nightshade and Flashmob (consisting of Chemistro, Cheshire Cat, Commanche, Dontrell "Cockroach" Hamilton, Mr. Fish, and Spear) tried to leave a spider-infested Manhattan by crossing a bridge only to be stopped by Misty Knight and her Heroes for Hire (consisting of Black Cat, Falcon, Gargoyle, Paladin, and Silver Sable).

Cottonmouth next appears as one of the competitors in an underground fight club that is broken up by Deadpool, Gambit, and Fat Cobra.

Cottonmouth was at some point arrested and imprisoned in Ryker's Island, which he escapes from during a riot that occurs during "Civil War II". With all of his assets either seized by the FBI or appropriated by Tombstone, a desperate Cottonmouth reaches out to Piranha Jones for help, and is convinced by Jones to side with him and Black Cat in an upcoming war for control of Harlem. Unimpressed by the duo's plans, Cottonmouth abandons them in favor of joining Alex Wilder's New Pride.

Powers and abilities
Cottonmouth has super-strength that rivals Luke Cage. He also has sharp teeth that he had sharpened to resemble fangs; combined with his jaw-strength they are capable of piercing Cage's "unbreakable" skin. Cottonmouth also has a good knowledge of different poisons.

Other versions
Cottonmouth appears in the Marvel Comics 2 series The Amazing Spider-Girl as the head of The Bronx branch of Black Tarantula's criminal empire. When a new villain called the Crimelord acquires and attempts to sell the Kingpin's files, Cottonmouth attends the auction for them in Black Tarantula's stead. The auction being crashed by the Hobgoblin and Spider-Girl leads to Cottonmouth and most of the other criminals present being arrested by the NYPD.

In other media

Cornell Bertram "Cottonmouth" Stokes appears in Luke Cage, portrayed by Mahershala Ali as an adult and Elijah Boothe as a teenager. This version despises his nickname, which was derived from a childhood incident wherein several of his teeth were knocked out, is capable of killing people bare-handed, the grandson of Harlem crime lord Maybelline "Mama Mabel" Stokes, cousin of city councilwoman Mariah Dillard, and was part of a gang in his youth alongside barbershop owner, Robert "Pop" Hunter. In the present, Stokes publicly operates as the owner of the Harlem's Paradise nightclub while privately working as a private arms dealer alongside Dillard, his assistant Shades, and several corrupt police officers on his payroll. While attempting to kill a group of street thugs who interrupted a deal he was conducting, Cottonmouth runs afoul of Luke Cage and Pop is killed in the crossfire of a botched hit on the last thug. Cage retaliates by attacking Cottonmouth's stash houses and depleting the arms dealer's fortune, but NYPD Detective Rafael Scarfe sells out Cage to Cottonmouth, who makes several failed attempts to kill Cage or drive him out of Harlem. Meanwhile, after internal affairs starts to investigate his actions, Scarfe attempts to blackmail Cottonmouth, who shoots him and leaves him for dead. Before he dies, Scarfe tells Cage and Claire Temple everything he knows about Cottonmouth's operation. Cottonmouth is subsequently arrested, but the Stokes' family lawyer Benjamin Donovan bails him out. While addressing the fallout, Stokes gets into an argument with Dillard over their upbringing, during which he invokes memories of their uncle raping her as a child, leading to her killing him and framing Cage for it.

References

External links
 

Characters created by George Tuska
Characters created by Len Wein
Comics characters introduced in 1974
Fictional African-American people
Fictional characters with superhuman durability or invulnerability
Marvel Comics characters with superhuman strength
Marvel Comics supervillains
Fictional crime bosses
Luke Cage